Henry Kent may refer to:

 Henry Kent (footballer) (1879–1948), English footballer and manager
 Henry Watson Kent (1866–1948), American librarian and museum administrator
 Henry Kent (inventor), Canadian inventor after whom asteroid 254422 Henrykent is named

See also 
 
 Harry Kent (disambiguation)